Ignatius Sserulyo (born c. 1937) is a Ugandan painter.

References

External links
Ignatius Sserulyo - Smithsonian Institution

1930s births
Living people
Ugandan painters
20th-century painters
21st-century painters
Year of birth uncertain